"Here We Go" is a song recorded by American boy band NSYNC for their self-titled debut album (1997). It was released as the third single from the album on May 5, 1997, by Trans Continental Records and BMG Ariola. The song was written and produced by Bülent Aris and Toni Cottura.

Music video
The music video premiered on terrestrial television in April 1997. The video features the group performing at a basketball game, with the song being used as the home team's main theme. It also shows members of the band participating in the game, and features them performing with cheerleaders during the chorus. The chorus features the vocals of NSYNC answered by the cheering crowd shouting "Yes yes yes, here we go, NSYNC has got the flow".
And it’s the titled track for their debut album too.

Track listing
CD single
"Here We Go" (radio cut) – 3:34
"Here We Go" (StoneBridge radio version) – 3:50

CD maxi single
"Here We Go" (radio cut) – 3:34
"Here We Go" (StoneBridge radio version) – 3:50
"Here We Go" (StoneBridge club mix) – 7:42
"Here We Go" (Hudson & Junior remix) – 4:51
"Here We Go" (extended mix) – 4:01

Charts

Year-end charts

Release history

References

1997 singles
NSYNC songs
Song recordings produced by Denniz Pop
Songs written by Toni Cottura
Songs written by Bülent Aris